The Awngi language, in older publications also called Awiya (an inappropriate ethnonym), is a Central Cushitic language spoken by the Awi people, living in Central Gojjam in northwestern Ethiopia.

Most speakers of the language live in the Agew Awi Zone of the Amhara Region, but there are also communities speaking the language in various areas of Metekel Zone of the Benishangul-Gumuz Region. Until recently, Kunfäl, another Southern Agaw language spoken in the area west of Lake Tana, has been suspected to be a separate language. It has now been shown to be linguistically close to Awngi, and it should be classified as a dialect of that language.

Phonology

Vowels

The central vowel  is the default epenthetic vowel of the language and almost totally predictable in its occurrence.

Consonants

Palatal and velar together in Awngi form only one place of articulation, which is called palato-velar.
Post-stopped fricatives are assumed to be single segments in Awngi for phonotactic reasons.
 is found word-initially in loanwords, but it can also be left out.
 does not occur word-initially. It is pronounced as a flap  when not geminate.
Between vowels,  is pronounced as a voiced bilabial fricative .
 is pronounced retracted, with slight retroflexion.
The labialization contrast in the palato-velar and uvular consonants is found only before the vowels  and word-finally.

Tones
Palmer and Hetzron both identified three distinctive tone levels in Awngi: high, mid and low. The low tone, however, only appears in word-final position on the vowel . A falling tone (high-mid) appears on word-final syllables only. Joswig reanalyzes the system as having only two distinctive tone levels, with the low tone being a phonetic variant of the mid tone.

Syllable structure
The Awngi syllable in most cases fits the maximum syllable template CVC (C standing for a consonant, V for a vowel). This means there is only one (if any) consonant each in the syllable onset and the rhyme. Exceptions to this happen at word boundaries, where extrametrical consonants may appear.

Phonological processes

Gemination
In positions other than word-initial, Awngi contrasts geminate and non-geminate consonants. The contrast between geminate and non-geminate consonants does not show up for the following consonants: .

Vowel harmony
Whenever a suffix containing the [+high] vowel  is added to a stem, a productive vowel harmony process is triggered. Hetzron calls this process regressive vowel height assimilation. Then the vowel harmony is blocked. Hetzron provides the following example: /moleqés-á/ ‘nun’ vs. /muliqís-í/ ‘monk’

Orthography
Awngi is used as Medium of Instruction from Grade 1 to 6 in primary schools of Awi Zone. It is written with an orthography based on the Ethiopian Script. Extra fidels used for Awngi are ጝ for the sound  and ቕ for the sound . Various aspects of the Awngi orthography are yet to be finally decided.

Morphology

The Noun
The noun is marked for number-cum-gender (masculine, feminine or plural) and case. The nominative is unmarked for one class of nouns, or marked by -i for masculine nouns and -a for feminine nouns. Other cases are accusative, dative, genitive, locative, directional, ablative, comitative, comparative, invocative and translative. Hetzron also mentions adverbial as a case of Awngi, but an interpretation as a derivational marker seems to be more appropriate. Both number-cum-gender and case are marked through suffixes to the noun stems.

The Verb
The Awngi verbal morphology has a wealth of inflectional forms. The four main tenses are imperfective past, imperfective non-past, perfective past and perfective non-past. There are various other coordinate and subordinate forms which are all marked through suffixes to the verb stems. The following distinctions are maintained for Person: 1sg, 2sg, 3masc, 3fem, 1pl, 2pl, 3pl.
Hetzron demonstrated that the Awngi verbal morphology is most economically described when it is assumed that for every verb there are four distinct stems: The first stem is for 3masc, 2pl, 3pl. The second stem is for 1sg only, the third stem for 2sg and 3fem, and the fourth stem for 1pl only. These four stems need to be noted for every verb in the lexicon and serve as the basis for all other verbal morphology. The stems remain the same throughout all verbal paradigms, and it is possible to predict the surface form of each paradigm member with these stems and the simple tense suffixes.

Syntax
The main verb of a sentence is always at the end. The basic word order is therefore SOV. Subordination and coordination is achieved exclusively through verbal affixation.

References

Bibliography 

 Appleyard, David L. (1996) "'Kaïliña' – A 'New' Agaw Dialect and Its Implications for Agaw Dialectology", in: African Languages and Cultures. Supplement, No. 3, Voice and Power: The Culture of Language in North-East Africa. Essays in Honour of B. W. Andrzejewski, pp. 1–19.
 Appleyard, David L. (2006) A Comparative Dictionary of the Agaw Languages (Kuschitische Sprachstudien – Cushitic Language Studies Band 24). Köln: Rüdiger Köppe Verlag.
 Hetzron, Robert. (1969) The Verbal System of Southern Agaw. Berkeley & Los Angeles: University of California Press.
 Hetzron, Robert (1976) "The Agaw Languages", in: Afroasiatic Linguistics 3/3.
 Hetzron, Robert (1978) "The Nominal System of Awngi (Southern Agaw)", in: Bulletin of the School of Oriental and African Studies 41, pt. 1. pp. 121–141. SOAS. London.
 Hetzron, Robert (1995) "Genitival agreement in Awngi: Variation on an Afroasiatic theme", in Plank, F (ed.) Double case. pp. 325–335. Oxford: Oxford University Press.
 Hetzron, Robert  (1997) "Awngi [Agaw] Phonology", in: Phonologies of Asia and Africa, Volume 1.  Ed. Alan S. Kaye.  Winona Lake:  Eisenbrauns.  pp. 477–491.
 Joswig, Andreas (2006) "The Status of the High Central Vowel in Awngi", in: Uhlig, Siegbert (ed.), Proceedings of the XVth International Conference of Ethiopian Studies, Hamburg July 2003 (Harrassowitz: Wiesbaden), p. 786-793.
 
 
 Joswig, Andreas and Hussein Mohammed (2011). A Sociolinguistic Survey Report; Revisiting the Southern Agaw Language areas of Ethiopia. SIL International. SIL Electronic Survey Reports 2011-047.
 Palmer, Frank R. (1959) "The Verb Classes of Agaw (Awiya)" Mitteilungen des Instituts für Orientforschung 7,2. p. 270-97. Berlin.
 Tubiana, J. (1957) "Note sur la distribution géographique des dialectes agaw", in: Cahiers de l'Afrique et de l'Asie 5, pp. 297–306.
 World Atlas of Language Structures information: http://wals.info/languoid/lect/wals_code_awn

Central Cushitic languages
Languages of Ethiopia
Amhara Region